The Xianyun (Old Chinese: (ZS) *g.ramʔ-lunʔ; (Schuessler) *hɨamᴮ-juinᴮ < *hŋamʔ-junʔ) was an ancient nomadic tribe that invaded the Zhou dynasty. This Chinese exonym is written with xian 獫 or 玁 "long-snouted dog", and this "dog" radical 犭 is commonly used in graphic pejorative characters. They were traditionally identified with the Xunyu, Guifang and Xiongnu.

Overview
The earliest record of the Xianyun is dated to the reign of King Xuan of Zhou (827/25–782 BC). The Book of Songs contains four songs about military actions between the Zhou and the Xianyun. The song "Gathering sow thistle" (Cai qi) mentions 3,000 Zhou chariots in battle against the Xianyun. The song "Sixth month" (Liu yue) says that the battlefield was between the lower courses of the Jing (泾河) and Luo rivers and the Wei valley, very close to the center of the Zhou state. 

Written records place the first incursions against Zhou under the name Xirong "Western Rong" in 843 BC. In 840 BC, the fourteenth year of reign of King Li of Zhou, the Xianyun reached the Zhou capital Haojing. Apparently, the "Western Rong" and Xianyun were the same people here, named in the first case by a generic term meaning "warlike tribes of the west" and in the second case by their actual ethnonym.

The Xianyun attacked again in 823 BC, the fifth year of reign of King Xuan. Some scholars (e.g. Jaroslav Průšek) suggest that their military tactics characterized by sudden attacks could only have been carried out by highly mobile troops, most likely on horseback and relate the appearance of the Xianyun to migrations from the Altai region in Chinese or, more specifically, the appearance of Scythians and Cimmerians migrating from the west. However, there is no definite evidence that the Xianyun were nomadic warriors; moreover, a Duo You bronze ding vessel inscription unearthed in 1980 near Xi'an tells that c. 816 BC Xianyun forces attacked a Jing (京) garrison in the lower Ordos region, drawing a Zhou military response. It indicated that like the Zhou, the Xianyun fought on horse-drawn chariots; contemporary evidence does not indicate that the increased mobility of the Xianyun is related to the emergence of mounted nomads armed with bows and arrows.

Later Chinese annals contain a number of references to the Xianyun, such as by Sima Qian (c. 145/135 – 86 BC), Ying Shao (140-206 AD), Wei Zhao (204-273), and Jin Zhuo (late 3rd–4th century AD). They stated that Xunyu (獯鬻) or Xianyun were terms that designated nomadic people who later during the Han dynasty were transcribed as "Xiongnu" (匈奴). This view was also held by the Tang dynasty commentator Sima Zhen (c. 8th century). Wang Guowei (1877–1927), as a result of phonetical studies and comparisons based on the inscriptions on bronze and the structure of the characters, came to the conclusion that the tribal names "Guifang" (鬼方), "Xunyu" (獯鬻), "Xianyu" (鮮虞), "Xianyun", "Rong" (戎), "Di" (狄), and "Hu" (胡) given in the annals designated one and the same people, who later entered history under the name Xiongnu. 

The exact time period when the nomads' ethnonym had the Old Chinese phonetizations ancestral to standard Chinese Xianyun remains determined only vaguely. Using the Bronze Inscriptions and Classic of Poetry, Sinologist Axel Schuessler posited the date of 780 BCE. 

Using Sima Qian's Shiji and other sources, Vsevolod Taskin concludes that in the earlier pre-historic period (during the time of legendary Yellow Emperor) the Xiongnu were called 葷粥 Hunyu, in the late pre-historic period (during the time of legendary Emperor Yao and Emperor Shun) they were called 戎 Rong, in the literate period starting with the Shang dynasty (1600–1046 BC) they were called 鬼方 Guifang, in the Zhou period (1045–256 BC) they were called 獫狁 Xianyun, starting from the Qin period (221–206 BC) the Chinese annalists called them 匈奴 Xiongnu.

Even so, Paul R. Goldin (2011) reconstructs the Old Chinese pronunciations of 葷粥 ~ 獯鬻 ~ 獯鬻 ~ 薰育 as *xur-luk, 獫狁 as hram′-lun′, and 匈奴 as *xoŋ-NA; and comments all three names are "manifestly unrelated". He further states that sound changes made the names more superficially similar than they really had been, and prompted later historians and commentators to conclude that those names must have referred to one same people in different epochs, even though people during the Warring States period would never have been thus misled.

Li Feng (2006) characterizes Wang Guowei's argument as "essentially deductive" and not based on solid evidence. Following Pulleyblank (1983), Li rejects the identification of the Xianyun with the Xiongnu, and only accepts identification of the Xianyun as one of the 戎 Rong "warlike foreigner" groups. Li proposes that the Xianyun were indigenous hunters, farmers, and pastoralists living in widely distributed communities in the "Northern Zone Complex" in the region stretching from the Yellow River's Ordos Loop to its upper reaches and they were possibly were cultural successors to the Ordos culture ( 6th to 2nd centuries BCE; from late Shang to early Western Zhou), with pastoralism gradually becoming dominant, and the Xianyun society boasted "a considerable size and high concentration of power", allowing them to field hundreds of chariots against the Zhou. Further, Li suggests that the Xianyun and Quanrong were either closely related or the term Quanrong was invented during Eastern Zhou period to denote the Xianyun. Li points to evidence from the Western Zhou bronze inscriptions, the Classic of Poetry, Guoyu, the Bamboo Annals, and that when the name Xianyun became written graphically pejorative as 獫狁 with the 犭"dog" radical, the character 獫's notion of dog motivated the coining of Quanrong (犬戎 ; lit. "Dog Barbarians").

Notes

References

See also
 Ethnic groups in Chinese history
 Xirong
 Guifang
 Xunyu
 Xiongnu

Ancient peoples of China
Xiongnu